Koilada is a village and a community of the Kozani municipality. Before the 2011 local government reform it was part of the municipality of Ellispontos, of which it was a municipal district. The 2011 census recorded 296 inhabitants in the village and 662 inhabitants in the community of Koilada. The community of Koilada covers an area of 21.416 km2.

Administrative division
The community of Koilada consists of three separate settlements: 
Koilada (population 296)
Kremasti (population 274)
Thymaria (population 92)
The aforementioned population figures are as of 2011.

See also
List of settlements in the Kozani regional unit

References

Populated places in Kozani (regional unit)